Archi was an Old Testament city on the boundary of Ephraim and Benjamin, between Bethel and Beth-horon the nether.

References

Hebrew Bible cities